Einar Snitt (1905-1973) was a Swedish footballer who played for the Swedish national football team. He was a reserve in the 1934 FIFA World Cup. He had 17 caps for Sweden. He was also part of Sweden's squad at the 1936 Summer Olympics, but he did not play in any matches.

References

1905 births
1973 deaths
Swedish footballers
Sweden international footballers
Association football midfielders
1934 FIFA World Cup players